Hashemabad (also Romanized as Hāshemābād; also known as Hāshemābād-e Patkū’īyeh) is a village in Tarom Rural District, in the Central District of Hajjiabad County, Hormozgan Province, Iran. At the 2006 census, its population was 562, in 157 families.

References 

Populated places in Hajjiabad County